Sidney Township may refer to:

Canada 

 Sidney Township, Hastings County, Ontario, now part of Quinte West

United States 

 Sidney Township, Champaign County, Illinois
 Sidney Township, Fremont County, Iowa
 Sidney Township, Montcalm County, Michigan
 Sidney Township, Towner County, North Dakota, in Towner County, North Dakota
 Sidney Township, Perkins County, South Dakota, in Perkins County, South Dakota

See also 
Sidney (disambiguation)

Township name disambiguation pages